Ocnogyna parasita is a moth of the family Erebidae. It was described by Jacob Hübner in 1790. It is found in the Alps, the Black Sea region, the Balkan Peninsula, Asia Minor and southern Russia.

The wingspan is 30–34 mm for males and 20–22 mm for females. Adults are on wing from March to April.

The larvae are polyphagous and have been recorded feeding on Gentiana lutea, Plantago, Urtica and Scabiosa species. Larvae can be found in May and June. The species overwinter as a pupa or as an adult.

Subspecies
Ocnogyna parasita parasita (Moldova, Crimea, Alps, C.Europe)
Ocnogyna parasita arenosa Witt, 1980
Ocnogyna parasita lianea Witt, 1980
Ocnogyna parasita rothschildi A. Bang-Haas, 1912 (Lower Volga)

References

External links

Lepiforum e.V.

Spilosomina
Moths described in 1790
Moths of Europe
Taxa named by Jacob Hübner